North Fayette Valley Community School District  is a rural public school district headquartered in West Union, Iowa.

The district is located in sections of Fayette and Clayton counties, and serves West Union, Clermont, Elgin, Fayette, Hawkeye, and Wadena.

Elementary schools are located in Elgin, Fayette and West Union; the middle school is located in Elgin and the high school is located in West Union. The mascot in the Tigerhawks, and the colors are light blue, silver and black.

It formed on July 1, 2018, as a merger of the North Fayette Community School District and the Valley Community School District.

Schools
The district operates five schools:
 Fayette Elementary School, Fayette (Closing June 30, 2023)
 Valley Elementary School, Elgin
 West Union Elementary School, West Union
 North Fayette Valley Middle School, Elgin
 North Fayette Valley High School, West Union

North Fayette Valley High School

Athletics
The Tigerhawks compete in the Upper Iowa Conference in the following sports:

Cross Country
Volleyball
Football
2014 Class 2A State Champions
Basketball
Wrestling
Track and Field 
Golf 
Baseball 
Softball
Bowling

See also
List of school districts in Iowa
List of high schools in Iowa

References

External links
 North Fayette Valley Community School District

School districts in Iowa
School districts established in 2018
2018 establishments in Iowa
Education in Clayton County, Iowa
Education in Fayette County, Iowa